is a town located in Iburi Subprefecture, Hokkaido, Japan.

As of September 2016, the town has an estimated population of 4,205, and a density of 18 persons per km2. The total area is 233.54 km2.

Climate

Notable people from Toyoura
Daisuke Naito, former professional boxer

References

External links

Official Website 

Towns in Hokkaido